MPAC or Mpac may refer to:
 The Malaria Policy Advisory Committee
 The Municipal Property Assessment Corporation, headquartered in Pickering, Ontario, Canada
 The Muslim Public Affairs Council, headquartered in Los Angeles, California, United States
 The Muslim Public Affairs Committee UK, headquartered in the United Kingdom
 The Malawi Public Affairs Committee, a Muslim religious body in Malawi
 The Metropolitan Performing Arts Center in Spokane, Washington, United States
 The Manufacturers' Political Action Committee of the Illinois Manufacturers' Association
 The Multi-purpose Attack Craft, a class of fast military assault boat by the Philippine Navy

See also 
 Mpack, Senegal, a border crossing with Guinea-Bissau
 Experimental Media and Performing Arts Center (EMPAC)
 Muslim American Public Affairs Council, headquartered in Raleigh, North Carolina, United States
 Modular Protection Automation & Control (MPAC), modular control buildings for substations